Knauf Insulation is an international company owned by the Knauf family and is an important manufacturer of insulation products in the US and Europe. The company is a producer of insulation materials such as glass wool, stone wool, wood wool boards, EPS, XPS, as well as the Heradesign wood wool based acoustic ceiling systems.

The company has production sites in Slovenia, the US, Mexico, Europe and Russia.

References

External links

 https://www.knaufnorthamerica.com
 https://www.knaufinsulation.com
 https://www.knaufinsulation.com.au

Manufacturing companies of Germany
Companies based in Bavaria